A municipal election in Windsor, Ontario took place on Monday, November 13, 2006. The following positions were elected:

Mayor of Windsor (1)
City Council (10)
Greater Essex County District School Board Trustees (6)
Windsor-Essex Catholic District School Board Trustees (5)
Conseil scolaire de district du Centre-Sud-Ouest Trustee (1)
Conseil scolaire de district des écoles catholiques de Sud-Ouest Trustees (3)

Not Running Again

The following incumbents did not run for re-election:

Kevin Wilkinson, Public School Board Trustee, Wards 1, 2, and 3
Thomas Wilson, City Councillor, Ward 5
Joyce Zuk, City Councilor, Ward 1

Election results

The following is a list of candidates and their results. Incumbents are noted with an (X). Elected officials are in bold

Mayor of Windsor
(elect one)

Eddie Francis (X): 44,527, 77.56%
David Wonham: 10,308, 17.95%
Mohamed Chams: 1,502, 2.62%
Mohamad-Ali Beydoun: 1,074, 1.87%

City Council
(elect two per ward)

Ward 1

David Brister (X): 10,437, 32.50%
Drew Dilkens: 8,827, 27.49
Gregory R. Baggio: 4,564, 14.21
Alphonso Teshuba: 2,771, 8.63%
Tom Lynd: 1,621, 5.05%
Mohammad Khan: 1,437, 4.48%
Henry Lau: 1,268, 3.94%
Ed Kobrosly: 1,187, 3.70%

Ward 2

Ron Jones (X): 4,497, 37.41%
Caroline Postma (X): 2,728, 22.69%
Gail Growe: 1,854, 15.42%
Dan Petoran: 1,697, 14.12%
Chris Schnurr: 434, 3.61%
Chris Richie: 424, 3.53%
Tom Livingston: 388, 3.23%

Ward 3

Fulvio Valentinis (X): 5,679, 37.51%
Alan Halberstadt (X): 5,369, 35.46%
Anthony "Tony" Blak: 4,091: 27.02%

Ward 4

Bill Marra: 7,163, 36.13%
Ken Lewenza, Jr. (X): 4,879 24.61%
Dave Cassivi (X): 3,726, 3,726, 18.79%
Ed Sleiman: 3,259, 16.44%
John Middleton: 801, 4.04%

Ward 5

Jo-Anne Gignac (X): 9,220, 36.72%
Percy Hatfield: 9,080, 36.16%
Frank Batal: 1,956, 7.79%
Irene Taylor: 1,743, 6.94%
William (B.J.) Taylor: 929, 3.70%
Steve Farrell: 800, 3.19%
Stephane Beaudin: 692, 2.78%
Bill Kachmaryk: 691, 2.75%

Greater Essex County School Board Trustees

Wards 1, 2, and 3 (elect four)

Tom Kilpatrick (X): 10,066, 17.12%
Beth Cooper (X): 9.874, 16.79%
Lisa Gretzky: 9,285, 15.79%
Kim McKinley: 8,604, 14.63%
Shelly Harding-Smith (X): 8,216, 13.97%
David Ferguson: 7,700, 13.10%
Sabrina Baskey-East: 5,050, 8.59%

Wards 4 and 5 (elect two)

Gale Simko Hatfield (X): 7,737, 34.07%
Cheryl Lovell: 5,808, 25.57%
Steve Micallef (X): 3,578, 15.76%
Jeewen Gill: 2,942, 12.95%
Kenny (Kenny G.) Gbadebo, 2,645, 11.65%

Windsor Essex Catholic District School Board Trustees
(Elect one per ward)

Ward 1

John Macri (X)- acclaimed

Ward 2

Patrick Keane (X): 831, 39.07%
Frank Favot: 812, 38.18%
Robert J. Potomski, 484, 22.78%

Ward 3

Shannon Porcellini (X): 936, 35.96%
Bernard Maztromattei: 886, 34.04%
Gerry N. Bondy: 781, 30.00%

Ward 4

Fred Alexander (X): 2,572, 64.43%
Daniel Roncone: 1,420, 35.57%

Ward 5

Barbara Holland (X) - acclaimed

Conseil Scolaire Public de District du Centre Sud-Ouest Trustee
(Elect one)

County of Essex

François Gratton (X) - acclaimed

Conseil Scolaire de District des Ecoles Catholique Sud-Ouest Trustees
Elect one

City of Windsor, Ward 1 and Town of LaSalle (combined)

Adrien Bezaire (X)- acclaimed

Wards 2, 3, and 4 (combined)

Cecile Vachon (X)- acclaimed

City of Windsor, Ward 5 and Town of Tecumseh (combined)

Joseph Bisnaire (X) - acclaimed

See also

List of mayors of Windsor, Ontario
2006 Ontario municipal elections
Windsor, Ontario
Windsor City Council

External links
City of Windsor Elections

2006 Ontario municipal elections
Municipal elections in Windsor, Ontario